The Ōtara River is found in the north of New Zealand's North Island. It shares its estuary with the Waioeka River.

Rivers of the Bay of Plenty Region
Rivers of New Zealand
Ōpōtiki